Pavlína Jobánková (born December 3, 1973 in Nymburk) is a Czechoslovak-Czech sprint canoer who competed in the early to mid-1990s. At the 1992 Summer Olympics in Barcelona for Czechoslovakia, she was eliminated in the semifinals of both the K-2 500 m and the K-4 500 m events. Four years later in Atlanta for the Czech Republic, Jobánková was eliminated in the repechages of the K-1 500 m event and the semifinals of the K-2 500 m event.

References
 Sports-Reference.com profile

1973 births
Canoeists at the 1992 Summer Olympics
Canoeists at the 1996 Summer Olympics
Czech female canoeists
Czechoslovak female canoeists
Living people
Olympic canoeists of Czechoslovakia
Olympic canoeists of the Czech Republic
People from Nymburk
Sportspeople from the Central Bohemian Region